Volcano museum may refer to the following museums in the Eifel mountains:

Volcano Museum, Daun
Volcano House, Strohn
German Volcano Museum, Mendig